Joanna Cindy Veron Miranda (born November 19, 1990) is a Filipino actress and beauty pageant titleholder who was crowned Binibining Pilipinas Tourism 2013 at the Binibining Pilipinas 2013.

Early life
She was born to Ana and Tony Miranda. She has four siblings. Miranda finished her Tourism course in University of Santo Tomas in 2011 with cum laude honors.

Career
In 2011, she joined the cast of  Pinoy Big Brother: Unlimited. She became co-host of variety-game show Wil Time Bigtime from 2012 to 2013.

Pageantry

Binibining Pilipinas 2013
Miranda competed for the Binibining Pilipinas 2013 wherein she won as Binibining Pilipinas Tourism 2013 and garnered the awards for Binibining Petron and Cream Silk Beyond Beautiful Woman Award.

Miss Tourism Queen International 2013
She represented the Philippines at the Miss Tourism Queen International 2013 pageant in Xianning, China on October 3, 2013. At the end of the competition, she placed in the Top 10.

Filmography

Drama series

Film

References

External links
 

1990 births
Living people
Filipino television actresses
Binibining Pilipinas winners
Pinoy Big Brother contestants
Miss Philippines Earth contestants